Do You See Me? is a 2014 Italian comedy film written and directed  by Riccardo Milani and starring Paola Cortellesi and Raoul Bova. It grossed $6,571,282 at the Italian box office.

Plot 
With a brilliant career in London, Serena, an architect originally from Abruzzo, decides to return to work in Italy, in Rome. For a woman to get a job at the height of her qualification as a really good architect proves to be difficult, until she decides to pass herself as a man. So she decides to work in the redevelopment of the Corviale district.

In Rome, meanwhile, she meets Francesco, and she becomes instantly attracted to him. When she understands he is a homosexual man, the two of them become close friends and start a long lasting relationship. As he will help her pretending to be the man behind her project for the Corviale district, and doing so making the contractors produce and give a monetary value to her/his idea, she will help him coming out to his son, that he had had from a previous marriage.

Cast 
 Paola Cortellesi as Serena Bruno
 Raoul Bova as Francesco
 Corrado Fortuna as Pietro
 Lunetta Savino as Michela
 Marco Bocci as Nicola
 Ennio Fantastichini as Dr. Ripamonti
 Cesare Bocci as Volponi
 Stefania Rocca as Maria
 Armando De Razza as Ennio Tintozzi

See also 
 List of Italian films of 2014

References

External links 

2014 comedy films
Italian comedy films
Italian LGBT-related films
Films directed by Riccardo Milani
Films about architecture
2014 LGBT-related films
2010s Italian-language films
2010s Italian films